Wild Style is a 1983 American hip hop film directed and produced by Charlie Ahearn. Regarded as the first hip hop motion picture, it includes appearances by seminal figures such as Fab Five Freddy, Lee Quiñones, Lady Pink, The Rock Steady Crew, The Cold Crush Brothers, Queen Lisa Lee of Zulu Nation, Grandmaster Flash and ZEPHYR.

Wild Style was shot in 1981, completed in 1982, and released theatrically in 1983. The film was later released on home video by Rhino Home Video in 1997. In 2007, it was released on DVD for the 25th anniversary. A 30th anniversary collector's edition was released on Blu-ray in 2012.

Background
An early version of the Wild Style logo appeared in 1981 when Charlie Ahearn hired graffiti writer Dondi to paint the "window down" subway car piece that appears in the film. The Dondi piece was the inspiration for the animated title sequence designed by the artist, Zephyr and animated by Joey Ahlbum in 1982. The Wild Style mural was painted by Zephyr, Revolt and Sharp in 1983. Charlie Ahearn and Fab 5 Freddy began working on the film on late 1981. The approach was a hybrid of a narrative musical and documentary, having the real hip hop pioneers play themselves in a loosely scripted story shot entirely in the South Bronx, the Lower East Side and MTA subway yards.

Synopsis
Wild Style centers around a Bronx teenager named Raymond (Lee Quiñones), who under the pseudonym "Zoro" is a celebrated but anonymous graffiti artist. Raymond scorns a group of graffiti artists, known as the Union Crew, who have turned their talents to legitimate, commissioned murals on the walls of playgrounds and business establishments. Their graffiti murals attracted the attention of Virginia (Patti Astor), a journalist, who brings the uptown hip-hop culture to the downtown art world. There are a series of encounters with graffiti artists, rappers and breakers, leading up to a giant rap-break concert in a Lower East Side band shell decorated by Raymond.

Cast 

 Lee Quiñones (Lee) as Raymond Zoro
 Frederick Brathwaite (Fab 5 Freddy) as Phade
 Sandra Fabara (Lady Pink) as Rose Lady bug
 Patti Astor as Virginia
 Andrew Witten (Zephyr) as Zroc 
 Carlos Morales as Raymond's Brother
 Alfredo Valez as Boy with Broom 
 Niva Kislac as Art Patron 
 Bill Rice as TV Producer

Release 
Wild Style premiered as part of the New Directors/New Films Festival at the 57th Street Playhouse in New York on March 18, 1983. In November 1983, the film opened at the Embassy 46th Street Theatre on Broadway. By early 1984, it was being shown in other major cities.

Reception
Film critic Vincent Canby wrote for The New York Times that Wild Style "never discovers a cinematic rhythm that accurately reflects and then celebrates the rare energy and wit of the artists within the film." However, he noted that the "subjects are appealing, especially Mr. Quinones, a graffiti artist in real life, and Frederick Brathwaite as a very cool artistpromotor."

On Rotten Tomatoes the film has an approval rating of 89% based on 18 reviews. Phelim O'Neill of The Guardian noted that despite the low production values, "nothing else comes close to capturing the atmosphere of the early days of hip-hop and spraycan art..." Reviewing the film for BBC, David Mattin wrote that "Wild Style is a cult classic - indisputably the most important hip hop movie, ever."

Historical value and impact 
The plot of Wild Style is fairly loose and the film is more notable for featuring several prominent figures from early hip hop culture such as Busy Bee Starski, Fab Five Freddy, The Cold Crush Brothers and Grandmaster Flash. Throughout the movie, there are scenes depicting activities common in the early days of hip hop. These include MCing, turntablism, graffiti and b-boying. The film demonstrates the interconnections between music, dance and art in the development of hip hop culture.

The film has received a large cult following over the years after its initial release. Highly regarded hip hop albums such as Illmatic by Nas, Midnight Marauders by A Tribe Called Quest, Black Sunday by Cypress Hill, Resurrection by Common, Big Shots by Charizma, Mm..Food by MF Doom, Check Your Head by Beastie Boys, Beat Konducta by Madlib, Jay Stay Paid by J Dilla and Quality Control by Jurassic 5 have used samples from the film.

In 2007, the VH1 Hip Hop Honors paid tribute to Wild Style in recognition of its influence upon the culture. The film was also voted as one of the top ten rock and roll films of all time by the Rock and Roll Hall of Fame. In 2012, Wild Style was ranked No. 1 on Billboard's list of the Top 10 Best Hip-Hop Movies Ever. The film was exhibited as part of a 1980s art retrospective at the Museum of Contemporary Art, Chicago and the Institute of Contemporary Art, Boston in 2012. In 2021, it was shown at the Museum of Fine Arts, Boston to celebrate the closing weekend of the exhibition "Writing the Future: Basquiat and the Hip-Hop Generation."

Soundtrack 

Chris Stein of Blondie worked on the soundtrack and score of Wild Style. The original 1983 soundtrack was released by Animal Records. It consisted of 13 tracks recorded by various artists included in the film. A 25th anniversary edition expanded this to 17 tracks, plus a bonus disc of remixes, instrumentals and DJ tools. The album has been described by Allmusic as "one of the key records of early 1980s hip-hop".

See also 
 Style Wars
 Beat Street
 List of hood films

References

External links 

 Wild Style
 Wild Style: Times Online movie review
 New York Times Review
 [ Soundtrack]
 The Hip Hop History of Wild Style

Graffiti and unauthorised signage
1980s hip hop films
Films set in New York City
American docudrama films
Street culture
Musical film soundtracks
New York City hip hop
1983 films
1980s English-language films
1980s American films